The idea–expression distinction or idea–expression dichotomy is a legal doctrine in the United States that limits the scope of copyright protection by differentiating an idea from the expression or manifestation of that idea.

Unlike patents, which may confer proprietary rights in relation to general ideas and concepts per se when construed as methods, copyrights cannot confer such rights.  An adventure novel provides an illustration of the concept. Copyright may subsist in the work as a whole, in the particular story or characters involved, or in any artwork contained in the book, but generally not in the idea or genre of the story. Copyright, therefore, may not subsist in the idea of a man venturing out on a quest, but may subsist in a particular story that follows that pattern. Similarly, if the methods or processes described in a work are patentable, they may be the subject of various patent claims, which may or may not be broad enough to cover other methods or processes based on the same idea. Arthur C. Clarke, for example, sufficiently described the concept of a communications satellite (a geostationary satellite used as a telecommunications relay) in a 1945 paper that was not considered patentable in 1954 when it was developed at Bell Labs.

Legal origins and status
Philosophically, there is disagreement about the distinction between thought and language.
In the past it was often thought that the two could not be separated, and so a paraphrase could never exactly reproduce a thought expressed in different words.
At the opposite extreme is the view that concepts and language are completely independent, so there is always a range of ways in which a concept can be expressed.

In the United States, the doctrine originated from the 1879 Supreme Court case of Baker v. Selden. The Supreme Court held in Selden that, while exclusive rights to the "useful arts" (in this case bookkeeping) described in a book might be available by patent, only the description itself was protectable by copyright. In later cases, the Supreme Court has stated that "unlike a patent, a copyright gives no exclusive right to the art disclosed; protection is given only to the expression of the idea—not the idea itself," and that "copyright's idea/expression dichotomy 'strike[s] a definitional balance between the First Amendment and the Copyright Act by permitting free communication of facts while still protecting an author's expression.'" 

In the English decision of Donoghue v. Allied Newspapers Limited (1938) Ch 106, the court illustrated the concept by stating that "the person who has clothed the idea in form, whether by means of a picture, a play or a book" owns the copyright. In the Australian decision of Victoria Park Racing and Recreation Grounds Co. Ltd v. Taylor (1937) 58 CLR 479 at 498, Latham CJ used the analogy of reporting a person's fall from a bus: the first person to do so could not use the law of copyright to stop other people from announcing this fact.

Today, Article 1.2 of the European Union Software Directive expressly excludes from copyright ideas and principles that underlie any element of a computer program, including those that underlie its interfaces. As stated by the European Court of Justice in SAS Institute Inc. v World Programming Ltd., "to accept that the functionality of a computer program can be protected by copyright would amount to making it possible to monopolize ideas, to the detriment of technological progress and industrial development."

Scènes à faire
Some courts have recognized that particular ideas can be expressed effectively only by using certain elements or background. The French name for this doctrine is Scènes à faire. Therefore, even the expression in these circumstances is unprotected, or extremely limited to verbatim copying only. This is true in the United Kingdom and most Commonwealth countries.

The term "Scenes a faire" means "obligatory scene", a scene in a play that the audience "has been permitted to foresee and to desire from the progress of the action; and such a scene can never be omitted without a consequent dissatisfaction."  The term was applied to copyright law in Cain v. Universal Pictures (1942), where the United States District Court for the Southern District of California ruled that "... similarities and incidental details necessary to the environment or setting of an action are not the material of which copyrightable originality consists."
The concept has been used by U.S. and U.K. courts.
The term is used both in the sense of a scene that follows inevitably from a situation,
or a standard scene that is always included in a particular genre of work.
Another court said "Under the ... doctrine of scènes à faire, courts will not protect a copyrighted work from infringement if the expression embodied in the work necessarily flows from a commonplace idea."
The concept has been extended to computer software, where some aspects may be dictated by the problem to be solved, or may be standard programming techniques.

In the United States it is recognized that certain background elements are universal or at least commonplace in some types of work. For example, in Walker v. Time Life Films, Inc., 784 F.2d 44 (2d Cir. 1986), the Second Circuit said that in a film about cops in the South Bronx it was inevitable that the scenery would include drunks, stripped cars, prostitutes, and rats. In Gates Rubber Co. v. Bando Chemical Industries, Ltd., 9 F.3d 823 (10th Cir. 1993), the Tenth Circuit held that hardware standards and mechanical specifications, software standards and compatibility requirements, computer manufacturer design standards, target industry practices and demands, and computer industry programming practices were unprotectable scènes à faire for computer programs. The principle must have a limit, however, so that something is outside the scènes à faire doctrine for South Bronx movies. Perhaps, cockroaches, gangs, and muggings are also part of the South Bronx scène à faire, but further similarity such as the film having as characters "a slumlord with a heart of gold and a policeman who is a Zen Buddhist and lives in a garage surely goes beyond the South Bronx scène à faire. There must be some expression possible even in a cliche-ridden genre."

Merger doctrine
A broader but related concept is the merger doctrine. Some ideas can be expressed intelligibly only in one or a limited number of ways. The rules of a game provide an example. In such cases the expression merges with the idea and is therefore not protected.

There are cases where there is very little choice about how to express some fact or idea, so a copy or close paraphrase may be unavoidable.
In this case, the "merger doctrine" comes into play.
The fact or idea and the expression are seen as merged, and the expression cannot be protected.
The merger doctrine is typically applied only to factual information or scientific theories, not to imaginative works such as plays or novels where the author has a much broader choice of expression.
The merger doctrine has been applied to the user interface design of computer software, where similarity between icons used by two different programs is acceptable if only a very limited number of icons would be recognizable by users, such as an image looking like a page to represent a document.
However, in 1994 a U.K. judge in Ibcos Computers v. Barclays Mercantile Finance cast doubt on the merger doctrine, saying he was not comfortable with the idea that "if there is only one way of expressing an idea that way is not the subject of copyright."

United States courts are divided on whether merger prevents copyrightability in the first place, or should instead be considered when determining if the defendant copied protected expression.  Only one federal circuit, the Ninth Circuit, has specifically held that merger should be considered a "defense" to copyright infringement, but  this is not considered an affirmative defense as the plaintiff still carries the burden of proof that infringement occurred.

See also
 Feist Publications v. Rural Telephone Service
 Ho v. Taflove
 Functionality doctrine
 Stock character

Notes

Intellectual property law
Legal doctrines and principles